Nicaragua does not currently recognise same-sex marriages or civil unions.

Civil unions
Nicaragua recognises de facto unions (uniones de hecho) for cohabiting opposite-sex couples. Article 83 of the Family Code defines de facto unions as "a voluntary agreement between a man and a woman". Couples in these unions are offered the same rights as married couples, but are required to have lived together for at least two years in a "stable and notorious manner". Ramón Rodríguez, professor of criminal law and human rights at the Central American University, argues that the provisions "establishing marriage and stable de facto unions as between a man and a woman only constitute a violation of the universal principle of equality and non-discrimination".

Same-sex marriage

Background

Article 72 of the Constitution of Nicaragua states that:

In 2012, responding to a request from human rights groups to discuss the legalisation of same-sex marriage, a deputy from the Sandinista National Liberation Front said "they had to wait another 30 years for that to happen".

In June 2014, the Nicaraguan Congress approved a revised family code limiting marriage, de facto unions and adoption to heterosexual couples. The new code went into effect on 8 April 2015. Article 53 of the Family Code describes marriages as "a voluntary union between a man and a woman".

2018 Inter-American Court of Human Rights ruling
On January 9, 2018, in advisory opinion OC 24/7, the Inter-American Court of Human Rights (IACHR) ruled that countries signatory to the American Convention on Human Rights are required to allow same-sex couples to marry. The ruling states that:

Nicaragua ratified the American Convention on Human Rights on 25 September 1979 and recognized the court's jurisdiction on 12 February 1991. The ruling sets binding precedent for Nicaraguan courts. LGBT groups applauded the decision. The Mexican newspaper Milenio reported that the ruling came as a "shock" to LGBT activists. Ludwica Lega, head of the Nicaraguan Trans Association, said he was "happy" with the decision, but that "in the case of Nicaragua we are focused on priority issues such as improving the Health Law, to end discrimination, full access to education, and recognition of gender identity." The Government of Nicaragua never issued a formal response to the ruling, but activists and lawyers believe the country is now required to recognise same-sex marriage per its international obligations.

Public opinion
According to a Pew Research Center survey conducted between 9 November and 13 December 2013, 77% of Nicaraguans opposed same-sex marriage, 16% were in favor and 7% were undecided.

The 2017 AmericasBarometer showed that 24.5% of Nicaraguans supported same-sex marriage.

A survey published by the Nicaraguan Foundation for Economic and Social Development in January 2021 showed that 29% of Nicaraguans supported same-sex marriage.

See also 
 LGBT rights in Nicaragua
 Recognition of same-sex unions in the Americas

Notes

References 

LGBT rights in Nicaragua
Nicaragua